The Gustav Levor House is a historic home located in Gloversville, Fulton County, New York. It was built in 1892 and is an irregularly massed, -story, frame, Queen Anne–style residence.  It features complex massing, a polygonal wall bay, intersecting roofs and gables, and an engaged round corner tower with a conical roof.

It was listed on the National Register of Historic Places in 2005.

References

External links

Houses on the National Register of Historic Places in New York (state)
Queen Anne architecture in New York (state)
Houses completed in 1892
Houses in Fulton County, New York
National Register of Historic Places in Fulton County, New York